Dimitar Dimitrov, born 1937 in Chrisa near Aridaia, Pella regional unit, Greece, is an ethnic Macedonian philosopher, writer, journalist, and diplomat who was the Minister of Culture and Minister of Education in the Republic of North Macedonia.

In North Macedonia, Dimitrov has a reputation for being a Bulgarophile intellectual. Dimitrov is a supporter of the thesis that there was a process of de-bulgarisation in the 20th century on the territory of North Macedonia.

Dimitrov is an author of philosophical, political and children's books. He published three books with short stories for children - "Shepherd boy" (1960), "Goodbye childhood" and "Where we are children" (1962).

References 

1937 births
Living people
Slavic speakers of Greek Macedonia
Bulgarians from Aegean Macedonia
Macedonian children's writers
Macedonian writers
Macedonian diplomats
Macedonian scientists
Culture ministers of North Macedonia
Education ministers of North Macedonia
Child refugees

People from Aridaia